John Towneley may refer to:
 John Towneley (politician), English politician
 John Towneley (translator), translator of Hudibras into French

See also
 John Townley, musician, astrologer, and naval historian
 John Wes Townley, American stock car racing driver